The Thracian Sea (Thrakiko Pelagos) is the northernmost part of the Aegean Sea. It is bounded by Macedonia and Thrace as well as northwestern Turkey. The entire area of the sea lies north of the 40th parallel. Its length from east to west is from 23°E to about 25.8°E, or from the Strymonian Gulf east to the northernmost part of the Gallipoli peninsula and the width from north to south is about 40.25°N to 41°N, or from the Dardanelles north to the boundary between the Xanthi and the Rhodope regional units. Islands includes Thasos and Samothrace in Greece and Gökçeada (Imvros in Greek) in Turkey. In the south, the sea extends to the north coast of the island of Lemnos. The bays and gulfs includes the Ierissian Gulf to the southwest, the Strymonian Gulf where the Strymon River empties, the Kavala Gulf and the Saros Gulf in Turkey. Rivers emptying into this portion of the gulf include the Nestos and the Evros/Meriç. The famous thermal springs are Loutra Eleftheron in Kavala.

Ports
Amfipoli
Kavala
Alexandroupoli
Thasos
Samothrace

Gallery

References

 
Marginal seas of the Mediterranean
Aegean Sea
Seas of Greece
Thrace
Landforms of Xanthi (regional unit)
Landforms of Rhodope (regional unit)
Landforms of Eastern Macedonia and Thrace
Landforms of Thasos
Landforms of Evros (regional unit)
Seas of Turkey